Not One Inch: America, Russia, and the Making of Post-Cold War Stalemate is a 2021 book by M. E. Sarotte about the tensions between NATO, America and Russia during the Post-Cold War.

Background
The full title of the book is Not One Inch America, Russia, and the Making of Post-Cold War Stalemate. The title of the book comes from a line uttered by Secretary of State James Baker In February 1990 US . After the fall of the Soviet Union, in order to convince Mikhail Gorbachev to give up Eastern Germany, Baker said, "What if you let your part of Germany go, and we agree that NATO will "not shift one inch eastward from its present position." Sarotte’s conclusion is that the “animosity between Moscow and Washington over Nato’s future made the post-cold war politics look much like the cold war.

Reception
Andrew Moravcsik reviewed the book for the Council on Foreign Relations and he said the book was "engaging" and a "carefully documented account" of the diplomacy in the Post-Cold War. He said Sarotte detailed how many Western leaders gave informal assurances that NATO would not expand. Russia perceived betrayal because there was never any formal agreement. Rodric Braithwaite reviewed the book for the Financial Times. He said the book had a "great narrative and analytical flair, admirable objectivity", he praised the details and said it was a riveting account of NATO enlargement.

References

2021 non-fiction books
Russia–United States relations
Yale University Press books